Frances Russell (born 1941) is a Canadian author and journalist. She has been a columnist for the Winnipeg Free Press newspaper for several years, and has written two books: Mistehay Sakahegan – The Great Lake and The Canadian Crucible – Manitoba’s Role in Canada’s Great Divide.

External links
Manitoba Author Publication Index entry

1941 births
Living people